The Linville River is a river in western North Carolina.  The river begins in the slopes of Peak Mountain, Sugar Mountain and Flattop Mountain, in the Linville Gap area (also known as Tynecastle).  As it goes south through Avery County, it passes through the communities of Grandfather, Linville, Pineola, Crossnore and finally at Linville Falls.  After entering Burke County at the community of Linville Falls, the river becomes the centerpiece of the Linville Falls and the Linville Gorge, an area referred to as "the Grand Canyon of North Carolina."  After approximately 30 miles (48 km), the river ends at Lake James and the Catawba River; the original confluence with the Catawba River has been flooded by the creation of the reservoir in 1923.

In 1975, North Carolina designated  of the river as Linville State Natural River, including it in the state's Natural and Scenic Rivers System.

References

Rivers of North Carolina
Tributaries of the Catawba River
Rivers of Avery County, North Carolina
Rivers of Burke County, North Carolina
Protected areas established in 1975
Pisgah National Forest